The Preußisch Stargard district was a Prussian district that existed from 1772 to 1920 with varying borders. It was in the part of West Prussia that fell to Poland after World War I through the Treaty of Versailles in 1920. Its county seat was Preußisch Stargard. From 1939 to 1945 the district was re-established in German-occupied Poland as part of the newly established Reichsgau Danzig-West Prussia. Today the territory of the district is located in the Polish Pomeranian Voivodeship.

History 
With the First Partition of Poland, the area of the Preußisch Stargard district was annexed by the Kingdom of Prussia in 1772 and became part of the province of West Prussia, which was divided into six large districts, including the Stargard district. On 30 April 1815 the district became part of Regierungsbezirk Danzig in the province of West Prussia. As part of a comprehensive district reform, a new, smaller Preußisch Stargard district was formed on 1 April 1818, containing the towns of Dirschau and Preußisch Stargard. The district office was in Preußisch Stargard.

From 3 December 1829 to 1 April 1878 the provinces of West Prussia and East Prussia were united to form the Province of Prussia, which had belonged to the German Reich since 1871. The continuous population growth in the 19th century necessitated a district reform in West Prussia. So, on 1 October 1887, the new Dirschau district was created from the northern part of the Preußisch Stargard district, which included the town of Dirschau and its surrounding area.

Due to the provisions of the Versailles Treaty, the Preußisch Stargard district had to be ceded by Germany to Poland on 10 January 1920.

Demographics

Politics

District administrators 
 1850–1851:Bruno von Schrötter
 1851–1872:Karl von Neefe
 1872–1875:Anton Rothe
 1875–1887:Axel Döhn
 1887–1908:Franz Hagen
 1908–1911:Konrad Schulte-Heuthaus
 1911–1919:Leopold Wiesner

Elections 
In the German Empire, the Preußisch Stargard and Berent districts formed the Danzig 5 Reichstag constituency within the boundaries of 1871. This constituency was won by candidates from the Polish Party in all elections to the Reichstag between 1871 and 1912: 
 1871:Michael von Kalkstein
 1874:Michael von Kalkstein
 1877:Adam von Sierakowski
 1878:Adam von Sierakowski
 1881:Michael von Kalkstein
 1884:Michael von Kalkstein
 1887:Michael von Kalkstein
 1890:Boleslaw von Kossowski
 1893:Michael von Kalkstein
 1898:Anton Neubauer
 1903:Wladislaus von Wolszlegier
 1907:Jan Brejski
 1912:Petrus Dunajski

Municipalities 
In 1910, the Preußisch Stargard district comprised the town of Preußisch Stargard and 76 rural communities:

Landkreis Preußisch Stargard in occupied Poland (1939–1945)

History 
After the German invasion of Poland and the subsequent annexation of the district area by Nazi Germany, the district was re-established under the name Landkreis Preußisch Stargard in the newly established Reichsgau Danzig-West Prussia from 1939 to 1945. The towns of Großwollental and Preußisch Stargard were subject to the German municipal code of 30 January 1935, which was valid in the Altreich and provided for the enforcement of the Führerprinzip at the municipal level.

In the spring of 1945, the Soviet Red Army captured the district after which it was restored to Poland. In the following years, the remaining German population was expelled.

Place names 
By an unpublished decree of 29 December 1939 the German place names valid until 1918 were provisionally valid in the district. By an order of the Reich Governor in Danzig-West Prussia on 25 June 1942, all place names were Germanized with the consent of the Reich Minister of the Interior. Either the name from 1918 was retained or - if "not German enough" - acoustically adjusted or translated, for example:
 Adlig Lippinken: Adliglinde
 Barloschno: Schenkenberg
 Dombrowken: Damerau
 Groß Jablau: Großgabel
 Lesnian: Waldjahn
 Lubichow: Liebichau
 Osiek: Burgfelde
 Schlachta: Edelwalde
 Skorschenno: Wurzelacker
 Skurz: Großwollental

References 

PreussischStargar
PreussischStargard
Starogard County
PreussischStargard
PreussischStargard
PreussischStargard